WVOK (1580 AM, "Oldies 1580") is a radio station broadcasting Westwood One's Good Time Oldies satellite music format. Licensed to Oxford, Alabama, United States, the station serves the Anniston–Oxford metropolitan area. The station is currently owned by Woodard Broadcasting Company, Inc.

History

In Talladega: WJHB, WEYY
The Confederate Broadcasting Company, owned by W. K. Johnson, James Hemphill and Ned Butler, put WJHB on the air from Talladega, Alabama on April 15, 1956. Talladega's second radio station operated during the daytime only with 1,000 watts.

The Tallabama Broadcasting Company, which owned WGSV in Guntersville and WGAD in Gadsden, acquired WJHB in 1961, with the sale closing in 1962. New WEYY call letters were instituted along with the sale. The station was the victim of 1966 vandalism when someone disconnected the fuse blocks from the station's transmitter, causing a delay of more than two hours in signing it on for the day; general manager Jimmy Earl "Joe" Woodard said the intruder "apparently knew what he was doing" and was unsure as to the motive, since no items were stolen. WEYY's owners started a sister station, WANL, in Lineville in 1967; both stations broadcast country formats.
After having been the general manager since 1962, General manager Woodard became the owner when he acquired the station from former congressman Albert Rains in 1973; the licensee name was changed to the present Woodard Broadcasting Company in 1976. Features on WEYY in 1975 included Auburn Tigers football, ABC Contemporary newscasts, a daily Swap Shop, and a Gospel Music Showcase program at midday.

Move to Oxford
In 1973, Woodard opened WHTB (92.7 FM). 13 years later, he sought to reduce overlap between the AM and FM stations. On April 1, 1985, WHTB became WEYY-FM; the next year, 1580 AM moved to Oxford, Alabama as WOXR. The station broadcast an easy listening format, hoping to capture an audience that had listened to WHMA before that station flipped to country. 1580's move made it the first locally based radio station in Oxford, and Woodard gave it a second when Woodard settled with three competing applicants for a new FM station in the town in 1989—the first new FM for Calhoun County in 41 years—which signed on the air as adult contemporary WKFN "K-98" on February 19, 1990. The FM move enabled Woodard to remain competitive; within 18 months, K-98 was described as having changed Anniston into a two-station market opposite WHMA-FM "Alabama 100", while both stations' associated AMs had switched to automated programming.

By 2000, WOXR was airing a classic country format; it changed its call letters to WARB on August 28 of that year. The station changed its call letters to WVOK in 2002, matching the FM station which had adopted them in 1992. The station also adopted its present oldies format after changing call letters.

References

External links

VOK
Oldies radio stations in the United States
Radio stations established in 1956
1956 establishments in Alabama